The URO VAMTAC is a Spanish four-wheel drive military vehicle manufactured by UROVESA. Externally it is similar in appearance and design to the Humvee of the United States Military due to similar requirements. More than 2,000 of the vehicles have been delivered to the Spanish Armed Forces. Several other countries operate the VAMTAC as well, and it has seen service most recently in Afghanistan and Syria. The vehicle comes in three models, named I3, S3 and ST5, and has several configurations.

Development
The URO VAMTAC was developed by the Spanish company URO, Vehiculos Especiales S.A.  so that it would meet the requirements of the Spanish military for a multipurpose, air-portable, high mobility off-road vehicle with good payload capacity.

Just as the HMMWV entered production in 1984 the Spanish army started to think of purchasing their own multirole vehicle that would replace Land Rovers.

VAMTAC concept did not materialize until 1995 when a competition was held for a next-generation tactical vehicle. The American HMMWV was also a natural candidate for several reasons. UROVESA decided to design a vehicle that could exceed the US design.

After the vehicle was tested by the Spanish Ministry of Defence, UROVESA received a five-year contract and the URO VAMTAC was produced from 1998 to 2003. In October 2005, the Ministry of Defence awarded a new five-year contract for the URO VAMTAC after a three-month trial period. This also introduced some changes, and the two models of the vehicle which were named T3 and T5, were re-designated as I3 and S3 respectively. The URO VAMTAC is similar in appearance and design to the U.S. Military's Humvee, because both vehicles were designed to meet similar requirements and specifications.

Operational history

Approximately 1,200 units were delivered to the Spanish military under the initial contract from 1998. Roughly 60 percent of these were of the T5 model (later S3), and the rest were T3 (later I3). By late 2009, around 900 more units had been delivered under the second contract, bringing the total procured by Spanish forces to approximately 2,100 vehicles. All the vehicles delivered under the second contract have been of the S3 model. The military has equipped about 25 percent of the vehicles received under the initial contract with ballistic kits, increasing their armour. URO VAMTACs have been used by the Spanish National Police as well.

In April 2013, the Vamtac was selected as the chosen vehicle for all branches of the Spanish armed forces. This means they will replace HMMWVs used by Spanish Marines. A total of 772 vehicles were to be acquired over a 5-year period.

The Spanish military has used the URO VAMTAC in Afghanistan, as well in Congo and Lebanon. Several other countries use this vehicle.

All in all, according to a 2017 estimate, some 4,500 units are in service in more than 20 countries and so far in 50 different configurations.

Features and characteristics
The URO VAMTAC comes with four-wheel drive capability, and is available in three primary configurations – command and control, chassis-cab, and pick-up. The first comes with a four-door cab. The latter two versions are available with three cab types: two-door, four-door, or a four-door version with smaller rear doors and less cab space. Shelter type or cargo bodies such as hardtops can be added to the rear compartment, as well as weapons. It can accommodate a wide range of weapons including machine guns, grenade launchers, anti-tank missiles, 81 mm mortars, M40 recoilless rifles and light air defence missiles.

Both these specifications vary depending on the version. It is powered by Steyr Motors' M16-"Monoblock" engine (6-cylinder, turbocharged diesel engine) coupled with a five speed automatic transmission. The I3 uses a  engine, while the S3 is equipped with a  one.

Versions

The URO VAMTAC has been evolved in several versions:
URO VAMTAC Rebeco (1998-2003)
URO VAMTAC I3 (initially designed URO VAMTAC T3) (2004-2010)
URO VAMTAC S3 (initially T5) (2004-2010)
URO VAMTAC S3 ARMORED (2004-2010)
URO VAMTAC ST5 (since 2013)
URO VAMTAC ST5 BN3 (STANAG armor level 3) (since 2015)
URO VAMTAC SK95 (light artillery tractor on a ST5 chassis) (since 2018)
URO VAMTAC LTV (Light Tactical Vehicle) (2018)

Variants
VAMTAC is available in many different versions with different body types. Most popular variants are pick-up, command/control and chassis-cab. The chassis-cab variant can mount different types of shelters or cargo compartments.

There are several specialized variants of the URO VAMTAC according to the armament and configuration used. Several support variants have been produced with capabilities for towing, firefighting and resupplying. Notable variants include:
Ambulance vehicle with accommodation for two or four stretchers in the rear compartment.
Anti-tank vehicle equipped with either BGM-71 TOW or MILAN guided missiles. Currently Spain is installing its Spike missiles in these vehicles.
Anti-aircraft vehicle equipped with Mistral surface-to-air missiles. Currently Malaysia is installing its ZPU anti-aircraft guns. Indonesian Army variant are equipped with Starstreak missiles.
Artillery vehicle equipped with Type 63 multiple rocket launchers and M-63 Plamens.
Command and communications vehicle, with separate compartment in rear section to accommodate communications equipment. This versión has four-doors, cargo space and communication masts fitted on the corners of the shelter.
PSYOPS vehicle, equipped with loudspeaker arrays.
Fast Attack vehicle, designed for Special Forces and equipped for long range reconnaissance and infiltration missions.

Operators

Current operators
 – 60-80 vehicles 
 – 
 – 40+ vehicles, ST5 (RapidRanger MMS version) & LTV (LML/LML-NG & command version)
 – 255 vehicles
 – 103 vehicles 
 - National Gendarmerie (Malian Armed Forces) - 2 vehicles donated by the United States in late 2022.
 – 1,200 vehicles 
 – leased several prior to 2006, after which they were returned to Spain. Purchased 139 ST5 BN3 variant vehicles in October 2018.
 – 100 vehicles, S3 and S3-HD variants
 – 10 vehicles 
 – 
 – Spanish Armed Forces, National Police, Guardia Civil, Emergency Units – 2,900 vehicles
 - Royal Army of Oman, Royal Guard of Oman
 - Armed Forces of Ukraine - 20 vehicles delivered in April 2022.

Evaluation-only operators
 – (on trial, not adopted)
 – (on trial, not adopted)

Gallery

See also
 Humvee, which has a similar chassis and frame
 Hawkei – an Australian four-wheel drive military vehicle
 Iveco LMV – an Italian four-wheel drive military vehicle.
 Toyota Mega Cruiser – a Japanese four-wheel drive military vehicle, also similar in appearance and design to the US Humvee.
 List of armoured fighting vehicles by country

References

External links

UROVESA home page

Military vehicles of Spain
Off-road vehicles
Military light utility vehicles
Military vehicles introduced in the 1990s
Military trucks
All-wheel-drive vehicles